Diagoras Agia Paraskevi F.C. is a Greek football club, based in Agia Paraskevi, Lesbos, Greece

Honors

Domestic Titles and honors

  Lesbos FCA Champion: 5
 1984–85, 2006–07, 2008–09, 2014–15, 2016–17
  Lesbos FCA Cup Winners: 2
 2007–08, 2016–17

References

Football clubs in North Aegean
Lesbos
Mytilene
Association football clubs established in 1969
1969 establishments in Greece
Gamma Ethniki clubs